The events of 1992 in anime.

Accolades  
Animation Film Award: Porco Rosso

Releases

Film 
A list of anime that debuted in theaters between January 1 and December 31, 1992.

TV series 
A list of anime television series that debuted between January 1 and December 31, 1992.

OVA releases 
A list of original video animations that debuted between January 1 and December 31, 1992.

* Initially premiered Sept 29, 1991; VHS released January 1992

See also
1992 in animation

References

External links 
Japanese animated works of the year, listed in the IMDb

Years in anime
Anime
Anime